"Deep Inside" is a song by the American singer Mary J. Blige. It was written by Blige, Tara Geter and Kevin Deane for her fourth studio album, Mary (1999), while production was led by Deane. The song features a sample of piano playing from Elton John's "Bennie and the Jets" (1974). John and co-writer Bernie Taupin are also credited as songwriters.

The song was released as the second US single from Mary, and the third single elsewhere. Like the preceding single, "All That I Can Say" (1999), it was a moderate success in the United States, peaking at number fifty-one on the Billboard Hot 100. In the United Kingdom, it failed to reach the UK top 40. The music video for "Deep Inside" has Blige and her dancers performing to the song "Sincerity", which appears on the deluxe edition of the Mary album in the United States and the United Kingdom single of "Deep Inside".

Music video
The music video was shot on October 8, 1999, in New York City and was directed by Marcus Raboy. Another version of the music video has Elton John playing the piano. "Deep Inside" was premiered on November 10, 1999, on MTV during a season finale of the adults-only animated TV show, Beavis and Butt-head.

In the beginning, Blige steps on the stage, wearing a blonde glitter dress, before the screen fades out, flashing back all of the music videos that starred Blige herself, including "Love Is All We Need", "Seven Days", "Everything", "Be Happy", "I'm Goin' Down", "You Bring Me Joy", "Real Love" and "I Can Love You". The next scene begins with two security guards blocking the red carpet and Blige begins singing. After the first verse, she stands on the red carpet waving her hands at the whole audience taking pictures of her. She steps inside the tour bus looking in the mirror at herself, pushing her hand singing the hook.

In the next scene, Blige walks out of a 1997 Dodge Caravan, talking off a hoodie being exposed. Then she walks away from an electrical fence with a bronze-raccoon coat and a white tank. She stands in a Harlem neighborhood with the Manhattan Bridge mocking her 15 feet away. The next scene starts with black-suited dancers and Blige in a red suit dancing to her song "Sincerity". After the song ends, they clearly dance to "Deep Inside", with Blige singing loudly by herself. She looks at the screen screaming her quote "MJB" at the end of the song, where the Manhattan Bridge is shown.

Track listings

Credits and personnel 
Credits adapted from the Mary liner notes.

Mary J. Blige – executive producer, writer
Kirk Burrowes – executive producer
Kevin Deane – writer
Tara Geter – writer
Elton John – writer (sample)
Bernie Taupin – writer (sample)

Charts

Release history

References

1999 singles
Mary J. Blige songs
Songs with music by Elton John
Songs written by Mary J. Blige
Songs with lyrics by Bernie Taupin
1998 songs
MCA Records singles
Music videos directed by Marcus Raboy